Sonny Side Up is an  album by saxophonist Sonny Stitt recorded in 1960 and originally released on the Roost label.

Reception
The Allmusic site awarded the album 3 stars.

Track listing 
All compositions by Sonny Stitt except as indicated
 "Sonny Side Up" - 2:36  
 "On Green Dolphin Street" (Bronisław Kaper, Ned Washington) - 3:56  
 "The More I See You" (Harry Warren, Mack Gordon) - 3:43  
 "Don't Take Your Love from Me" (Henry Nemo) - 4:47  
 "My Blue Heaven" (Walter Donaldson, George A. Whiting) - 2:43  
 "My Mother's Eyes" (Abel Baer, L. Wolfe Gilbert) - 3:51  
 "When I Grow Too Old to Dream" (Oscar Hammerstein II, Sigmund Romberg) - 3:05  
 "Bye Bye Blues" (Fred Hamm, Dave Bennett, Bert Lown, Chauncey Gray) - 5:04  
 "I've Got the World on a String" (Harold Arlen, Ted Koehler) - 5:14

Personnel 
Sonny Stitt - alto saxophone, tenor saxophone
Jimmy Jones - piano
Aaron Bell - bass
Roy Haynes - drums

References 

1961 albums
Roost Records albums
Sonny Stitt albums
Albums produced by Teddy Reig